American actress Lea Thompson has performed in many well-known films and television series since the 1980s, among them  Howard the Duck, the Back to the Future trilogy and Caroline in the City. She has directed for television since 2006.

Filmography

Film

Television

Director

Video games

Music videos

See also 
List of 1989 box office number-one films in the United States
List of 1990 box office number-one films in the United States

References

External links 

 
 
 
 
 

Actress filmographies
American filmographies